Oxyurichthys lonchotus, commonly known as the speartail mudgoby, is a species of goby found in Hawaii and Indonesia.

References

lonchotus
Fish of the Pacific Ocean
Fish of Hawaii
Fish of Indonesia
Taxa named by Oliver Peebles Jenkins
Fish described in 1903